The 2017–18 Big East Conference men's basketball season began with practices in October 2017, followed by the start of the 2017–18 NCAA Division I men's basketball season in November. This season marked the 39th year in the conference's history, but the fifth as a non-football conference, which officially formed on July 1, 2013. Conference play began in December 2017. For the first time since the reconfigured Big East formed, Villanova failed to win the regular-season title, with Xavier claiming the crown.

The 2018 Big East men's basketball tournament was held at Madison Square Garden in New York from March 7 through March 10, 2018. Villanova defeated Providence to win the tournament championship and receive the conference's automatic bid to the NCAA tournament.

Six Big East schools received bids to the NCAA tournament (Butler, Creighton, Providence, Seton Hall, Villanova, and Xavier). Only Villanova won more than one game in the Tournament, but the Wildcats defeated Michigan to win the NCAA Championship for the second time in three years.

Marquette received a bid to the National Invitation Tournament, where they advanced to the quarterfinals before losing to eventual NIT champions Penn State.

Villanova guard Jalen Brunson was named the Big East Player of the Year and was consensus National Player of the Year. Villanova freshman forward Omari Spellman was named Big East Freshman of the Year. Xavier head coach Chris Mack was named Big East coach of the year.

Head coaches

Coaching changes 
On March 23, 2017, Georgetown officials announced that John Thompson III had been fired. On April 2, it was reported that Patrick Ewing would replace Thompson as head coach.

On June 9, 2017, Butler head coach Chris Holtmann left to become the head coach at Ohio State. On June 12, the school hired Milwaukee head coach and Bulter alum LaVall Jordan as head coach.

Coaches 

Notes: 
 Years at school includes 2017–18 season.
 Overall and Big East records are from time at current school and are through the end of the 2017–18 season. 
 Mack's A-10 and McDermott's MVC conference records not included since teams began play in Big East.

Preseason

Preseason poll 
Prior to the season, the Big East conducted a poll of Big East coaches, coaches do not place their own team on their ballots.

Preseason All-Big East teams
Source

Regular season

Rankings

Conference matrix
This table summarizes the head-to-head results between teams in conference play.

Player of the week
Throughout the season, the Big East Conference named a player of the week and a freshman of the week each Monday.

Honors and awards

All-Big East Awards and Teams

Postseason

2018 Big East tournament

NCAA tournament

The winner of the Big East tournament, Villanova, received the conference's automatic bid to the 2018 NCAA Division I men's basketball tournament.

National Invitation tournament

Marquette received an invitation to the National Invitation Tournament.

References

External links
Big East website